Terracotta, Inc. is a computer software company that specializes in increasing scalability  and performance of real-time Big Data applications. The company's flagship product is Terracotta DB, an in-memory distributed data management platform which provides persistent storage, caching and compute capabilities. Their products are used in 190 countries by over two million developers and more than 2.5 million deployments. The company is owned by Software AG.

History 
Terracotta began as a provider of clustering technologies for Java intended to simplify development, deployment, testing and management of enterprise applications by moving clustering and caching services to the Java Virtual Machine (JVM) instead of the application.

In August 2009, Terracotta purchased Ehcache. The company expanded the capabilities of Ehcache and developed enterprise-class products based on the open source project.   That year, Terracotta also acquired Quartz, the de facto standard job scheduler for Java.

Software AG acquired Terracotta in May 2011. Wolfram Jost, CTO of Software AG, cited Terracotta's scalability, performance, cloud enablement and in-memory strategy as the most critical factors for the acquisition.

In November 2017, Terracotta DB was launched, an in-memory data management platform for translytical (transactional and analytical) workloads, based on an evolution of Terracotta Big Memory. Terracotta DB adds persistent store and compute capabilities as well as claims 300% better performance on caching compared to previous releases.

Terracotta is the in-memory technology in the Software AG product stack. Additionally, its in-memory processing provides the foundation for Software AG's cloud offerings.

Awards 
 DataWeek's 2012 Big Data Technology Top Innovator Award

References

External links 
 

Java platform software
Software companies based in California
Software AG
Defunct software companies of the United States